Time for Love is the fifth studio album by American singer Freddie Jackson. It was released by Capitol Records on August 3, 1992 in the United States. The album includes the singles "Me and Mrs. Jones", "Can We Try" and the album's opener "I Could Use a Little Love Right Now". Time for Love by Jackson served as his last album with the label.

Critical reception

AllMusic editor Alex Henderson called Time for Love "a satisfying effort that isn't much different from his previous Capitol releases. The New Yorker obviously knew what his strengths were – smooth soul/urban contemporary music and romantic ballads – and once again, the singer succeeds by zeroing in on them [..] Though it falls short of the excellence of Rock Me Tonight and Just Like the First Time, this CD was a welcome addition to his catalog."

Track listing

Personnel and credits 
Musicians

 Freddie Jackson – lead vocals, backing vocals (1, 2, 3, 5-10)
 Barry J. Eastmond – keyboards (1, 2, 7, 8, 9), bass (1), drum programming (1, 2, 7, 8, 9), arrangements (1, 2, 7, 8, 9)
 Gene Lennon – keyboards (3), drum programming (3), drums (4)
 Joshua Thompson – keyboards (3), drum programming (3), drums (4)
 Kenni Hairston – keyboards (4, 10), arrangements (4, 10), drums (4), programming (10)
 Kiyamma Griffin – keyboards (5), drums (5)
 Joey Moskowitz – programming (10)
 Mike "Dino" Campbell – guitar (1)
 Ira Siegel – guitar (2)
 Najee – saxophone (6), lead vocals (6)
 Vincent Henry – saxophone (10)
 Andre Ward – saxophone (10)
 Yolanda Lee – backing vocals (1-4, 7, 8, 10)
 Audrey Wheeler – backing vocals (2, 3, 4, 7)
 Derrick Culler – backing vocals (3)
 Hunter Hayes – backing vocals (3)
 Janice Dempsey – backing vocals (5)
 Russell Patterson – backing vocals (5)
 Jerry Barnes – backing vocals (6)
 Katreese Barnes – backing vocals (6)
 Rachele Cappelli – backing vocals (6)
 Reggie Griffin – backing vocals (6)
 Will Downing – backing vocals (9)
 James D-Train Williams – backing vocals (9)
 D'Atra Hicks – lead vocals (11)

Charts

Weekly charts

Year-end charts

References

External links
 Time for Love at Discogs

1992 albums
Freddie Jackson albums
Capitol Records albums